The 2005 James Madison Dukes football team represented James Madison University in the 2005 NCAA Division I-AA football season as a member of the Atlantic 10 Conference. The Dukes were led by seventh-year head coach Mickey Matthews, and played their home games at Bridgeforth Stadium in Harrisonburg, VA. The team finished the season with a 7–4 record.

Despite winning the 2004 National Championship, the Dukes could not sustain the same amount of success from the previous season, failing to reach the playoffs.

Schedule

References

James Madison
James Madison Dukes football seasons
James Madison Dukes football